The 1932 Australian Championships was a tennis tournament that took place on outdoor Grass courts at the Memorial Drive, Adelaide, Australia from 6 February to 13 February. It was the 25th edition of the Australian Championships (now known as the Australian Open), the 5th held in Adelaide, and the first Grand Slam tournament of the year. The singles titles were won by Australians Jack Crawford and Coral McInnes Buttsworth.

Finals

Men's singles

 Jack Crawford defeated  Harry Hopman  4–6, 6–3, 3–6, 6–3, 6–1

Women's singles

 Coral McInnes Buttsworth defeated  Kathleen Le Messurier  9–7, 6–4

Men's doubles

 Jack Crawford /  Gar Moon defeated  Harry Hopman /  Gerald Patterson 4–6, 6–4, 12–10, 6–3

Women's doubles

 Coral McInnes Buttsworth /  Marjorie Cox Crawford defeated  Kathleen Le Messurier /  Dorothy Weston 6–2, 6–2

Mixed doubles

 Marjorie Cox Crawford /  Jack Crawford defeated  Meryl O'Hara Wood /  Jiro Sato 6–8, 8–6, 6–3

External links
 Australian Open official website

1932
1932 in Australian tennis
February 1932 sports events